Edward White (10 April 1922 – 4 April 2012) was an Australian rules footballer who played with Fitzroy in the Victorian Football League (VFL).

Notes

External links 

1922 births
Australian rules footballers from Victoria (Australia)
Fitzroy Football Club players
2012 deaths